Omer Fast (born in Jerusalem 1972) is a contemporary artist.

Early life and education
Born and raised in Jerusalem, Fast spent much of his teenage years in New York. He received his BFA from a dual-degree program at Tufts University and the School of the Museum of Fine Arts, Boston in 1995, majoring in English and painting, and an MFA from Hunter College in 2000. He subsequently got a job doing magazine layout before moving to Berlin in 2001.

Exhibitions
Fast has had solo exhibitions at the Pinakothek der Moderne, Munich (2020), Guangdong Times Art Museum (2018), Martin Gropius Bau, Berlin (2016), Jeu de Paume, Paris (2015), Wexner Center for the Arts, Columbus (2012), Whitney Museum of American Art, New York (2010), Berkeley Art Museum (2009), Museum of Modern Art, Vienna (2007), Carnegie Museum, Pittsburgh (2005), Midway Contemporary Art, Minneapolis (2005), Pinakothek der Moderne, Munich (2004), and the Frankfurter Kunstverein, Frankfurt (2003). His work has also been featured in dOCUMENTA (13) (2012) and the 54th Venice Biennale. In 2016 the Martin-Gropius-Bau in Berlin presented the exhibition "Omer Fast. Talking is not always the solution". His work has been exhibited in the United States and internationally. In October 2015, a monographic exhibition of Fast’s work titled Present Continuous opened at the Jeu de Paume, Paris, and subsequently travelled to the Baltic Center of Contemporary Art, Gateshead, UK, and the KUNSTEN Museum of Modern Art, Aalborg, Denmark. He has been the subject of solo exhibitions at the Stedelijk Museum in Amsterdam, the Netherlands;  Moderna Museet, Stockholm, Sweden; Le Caixa, Madrid, Spain; Musée d’Art Contemporain, Montréal, Canada; Museum of Contemporary Art, Krakow, Poland; STUK Leuven, Belgium; Dallas Museum of Art, TX; Cleveland Museum of Art, OH; the Art Institute of Chicago, IL; the Minneapolis Institute of Art, MN; and the Whitney Museum of American Art, NY. His work was featured in dOCUMENTA (13), the 54th Venice Biennale, and the 2002 and 2008 Whitney Biennials. He received a BFA from Tufts University and the Museum of Fine Arts, Boston and an MFA from Hunter College in New York City. Fast lives and works in Berlin.

Awards & collections
Fast was the recipient of the 2009 Preis der Nationalgalerie für Junge Kunst and the 2008 Bucksbaum Award from the Whitney Museum of American Art. Fast's work is in the collections of the Whitney Museum of American Art, Solomon R. Guggenheim Museum, Hamburger Bahnhof, Metropolitan Museum of Art, the Hirshhorn Museum and Sculpture Garden, and the Museum of Modern Art, Vienna.

Bibliography

Sabine Schaschl (ed.): "Omer Fast. In Memorry / Zur Erinnerung", Berlin (The Green Box) 2010. (English/German) 
“The Casting” (Monograph) Published by Museum of Modern Art, Vienna and Walter König Verlag, 2008 
Astrid Wege, "Cologne, Omer Fast, Kölnischer Kunstverein",  Artforum, Feb 2012
Barbara Pollack, "True Lies?",  ART News,February 2010
Andreas Schlaegel, "Nothing But the Truth", Programma Magazine, Spring 2010
Mark Godfrey, TJ Demos, Eyal Weizman, Ayesha Hammed, "Rights of Passage", Tate Etc., Issue # 19, 2010
Nav Haq, "Foresight into the New African Century", Kaleidoscope #5, Feb 2010
Holland Cotter, "Is It Reality or Fantasy?" New York Times, January 7, 2010 
Elisabeth Lebovici / Maria Muhle, Omer Fast,  Afterall, March 2009
Chen Tamir, "Omer fast, New Magic Realism", Flash Art, Issue #114, October 2008
Tom Holert, "Attention Span", Artforum, February 2008
Mark Godfrey, "Making History", Frieze, March/April 2006
Nav Haq, "Omer Fast, Godville", Bidoun, 2005 
Jennifer Allen, "Openings: Omer Fast", Artforum, September 2003 
Chris Chang, "Vision: Omer Fast", Film Comment, July/August 2003 
Marcus Verhagen, ‘Pleasure and Pain: Omer Fast Interviewed’ in Art Monthly Issue 330, October 2009 Brittania Art Publications LTD. Pp 1-4
"Omer Fast: Back to the Present" in Displayer. February 2009. pp 113-118
Omer Fast et al., The Death of the Artist (New York: Cabinet Books, 2019).

References

External links 

Bucksbaum Award
gb agency, Paris

1972 births
Living people
Israeli video artists
Hunter College alumni
People from Jerusalem
Jewish artists
Tufts University alumni
People from Jericho, New York
Israeli contemporary artists
Academic staff of the Karlsruhe University of Arts and Design